Indira Gandhi National Open University, known as IGNOU, is a Central University located at Maidan Garhi, New Delhi, India. Named after former Prime Minister of India Indira Gandhi, the university was established in 1985 with a budget of 20 million, after the Parliament of India passed the Indira Gandhi National Open University Act, 1985 (IGNOU Act 1985). IGNOU is run by the central government of India, and with total active enrollment of over 4 million students, it is the largest university in the world.

IGNOU was founded to serve the Indian population by means of distance and open education, providing quality higher education opportunities to all segments of society. It also aims to encourage, coordinate and set standards for distance and open education in India, and to strengthen the human resources of India through education. Apart from teaching and research, extension and training form the mainstay of its academic activities. It also acts as a national resource center, and serves to promote and maintain standards of distance education in India. IGNOU hosts the Secretariats of the SAARC Consortium on Open and Distance Learning (SACODiL) and the Global Mega Universities Network (GMUNET), initially supported by UNESCO. 

IGNOU has started a decentralisation process by setting up five zones: north, south, east, west and north-east. The first of the regional headquarters, catering to four southern states, Pondicherry, Andaman and Nicobar Islands and Lakshadweep, is being set up in the outskirts of Thiruvananthapuram in Kerala. The Ministry of Education
has entrusted the responsibility of developing Draft Policy on Open and Distance Learning and Online Courses to IGNOU. IGNOU also partners up with other organizations to launch courses. IGNOU offers a BBA in Retail distance learning course in association with Retailers Association of India (RAI).

Recently, the university has implemented the CBCS method to the various bachelor's degree courses including BA, BAVTM, BCOM, BSC, and others. As per the new CBCS system, the [] will be conducted through the semester system that was earlier conducted on an annual mode.

History 
Dipanshu Sharma, the Ministry of Education and Social Welfare organized a seminar on 'Open University' in collaboration with the Ministry of Information and Broadcasting, the UGC, and the Indian National Commission for Cooperation with UNESCO. After the seminar recommendation, an open university in India has established on an experimental basis. Starting in 1974, the government of India appointed an eight-member working group on the open university, the leading role was given to G. Parthasarathi, the then Vice-Chancellor of the Jawaharlal Nehru University.

The working group recommended establishing an open university by an act of parliament as early as possible. They recommended that the university should have jurisdiction over the entire country so that, once it is fully developed, any student even in the remotest corner of the country can have access to its instruction and degrees (Working Group Report, 1974). (Here are some suggestions to assist you in achieving your aim of scoring above 70 on the IGNOU term end exams)

The working group suggested several measures to be followed in instructional and management processes of the open university which included: admission procedure, age relaxation, preparation of reading materials, setting up of core group scholars in different fields, setting up of study centers, the vehicle of curricular programs, live contact with teachers and so on. On the basis of the recommendations of the working group, the Union Government prepared a draft bill for the establishment of a National Open University, but due to some reasons, the progress was delayed.

In 1985, the Union Government made a policy statement for the establishment of a national open university. A Committee was constituted by the Ministry of Education to chalk out the plan of action for the National Open University. On the basis of the report of the Committee, the Union Government introduced a bill in Parliament. In August 1985, both the Houses of Parliament passed the bill. Subsequently, the Indira Gandhi National Open University came into existence on 20 September 1985, named after the late prime minister.

In 1989, the first Convocation was held and more than 1,000 students graduated and were awarded their diplomas. IGNOU audio-video courses were the first broadcast by radio and television in 1990 and IGNOU awarded degrees received full recognition by the University Grants Commission in 1992 as being equivalent to those of other universities in the country.

In 1999, IGNOU launched the first virtual campus in India, beginning with the delivery of Computer and Information Sciences courses via the Internet.

 IGNOU has served over 3 million students in India and 40 other countries abroad. These are UAE, UK, Qatar, Kuwait, Oman, Bahrain, Saudi Arabia, Seychelles, Mauritius, Maldives, Ethiopia, Namibia, Kenya, Myanmar, Vietnam, Singapore, Indonesia, Malaysia, China, Nepal, Sri Lanka, Kyrgyzstan, Afghanistan, Fiji, France, Ghana, Gambia, Sierra Leone, Madagascar, Liberia, West Indies, Samoa, Lesotho, Malawi, Switzerland, Nigeria, Mongolia, and Zambia.

Languages 
The IGNOU offers education in undergraduate degree in different "Modern Indian Languages" (MILs): Malayalam, Marathi, Odiya, Punjabi, Tamil, Telugu, Assamese, Bengali, Bhojpuri, Gujarati, Kannada, Kashmiri, Meitei (Manipuri) and Nepali.

Schools 
IGNOU has 21 schools and a network of 56  regional centres, 1843 study centres, and 21 overseas centres (in 15 countries). Approximately 20% of all students enrolled in higher education in India are enrolled with IGNOU. IGNOU offers 226 academic programs comprising courses at certificate, diploma and degree levels.

Research Unit 
The Research Unit has been established at the Indira Gandhi National Open University vide notification dated 6 October 2008. Prior to that, research-related activities were looked after by the Academic Coordination Division. The Unit has been established with the following objectives:

 To conduct Research Council and Research Council's Standing Committee meetings for developing policies and frameworks for the conduct of research activities.
 To register and monitor all full-time and part-time MPhil and PhD candidates.
 To engage Research Teaching Assistants under IGNOU-DEC RTA Scheme for the conduct of research and teaching.
 To conduct workshops/seminars on research methodology for full-time and part-time research candidates.
 To facilitate systemic/discipline-based research in the University.

Institutes, Cells, Centres, Units

Accreditation & recognition 
(IGNOU) has been granted the authority to confer degrees by Clause 5(1)(iii) of the IGNOU Act 1985. IGNOU is also recognised as a Central University by the University Grants Commission of India (UGC). The Association of Indian Universities (AIU) recognises IGNOU conferred degrees as on par with the degrees conferred by its members and the All India Council for Technical Education (AICTE) recognises the Master of Computer Applications and Master of Business Administration program of IGNOU.

In 1993, IGNOU was designated by the Commonwealth of Learning (COL) as its first Centre of Excellence for Distance Education empowered "to actively participate in Commonwealth co-operative endeavors to identify, nurture, and strengthen open learning institutions throughout the Commonwealth, particularly in the Third World ..".

IGNOU also operates as an accreditor for open university and distance education systems in India through the Distance Education Council (DEC). Authority to do so is granted under Clause 16 and Statute 28 of the IGNOU Act 1985.

IGNOU is accredited by National Assessment and Accreditation Council (NAAC) with the highest grade of A++.

Convocations in the past

Notable faculty

Nageshwar Rao - current vice chancellor of IGNOU
Barun Mazumder - journalist
Kapil Sibal - politician and lawyer
George Panthanmackel - professor
Nandini Sahu - poet and creative writer
Raman Kapur - medical writer and doctor
Ashok Kumar Hemal - academic and urologist
Ram G. Takwale - former vice chancellor of IGNOU
Shyam Singh Shashi - anthropologist and poet
M. Aslam - former vice chancellor of IGNOU
Mahipatsinh Chavda - academic
Saju Chackalackal - professor and catholic priest
G. Ram Reddy - first vice chancellor of IGNOU
Madhavan K. Palat - historian
K. Satchidanandan - poet
Sarat Kumar Mukhopadhyay - poet and translator
V. C. Kulandaiswamy - 2nd vice chancellor of IGNOU
V. N. Rajasekharan Pillai - scientist
Bibhu Padhi - poet and translator
Srikrishna Deva Rao - scholar
Jai Chandiram - media personality
Jyoti Gogte - entrepreneur and academic
Amiya Pujari - computer scientist
Mahendra Bhatnagar - poet

Notable alumni

Osthatheos Issac - Syriac Orthodox bishop
Celina Jaitly - Indian actress
Vaani Kapoor - Indian actress
Deepika Padukone - Indian actress
Chethana Ketagoda - Sri Lankan actress
Barun Mazumder - Indian journalist
Ashok Khemka - Indian bureaucrat
K. Vijay Kumar - IPS officer
K. H. Hussain - Indian designer
Abhay Sopori - Indian musician
Gyaneswar Patil - Indian politician
Karthika Naïr - Indian poet
B. Devendhira Poopathy - Indian poet and writer
V. S. R. Murthy - Indian military officer 
Biswatosh Sengupta - Indian academic
Ashraful Hussain - Indian social activist and politician
Arjun Munda - former Chief Minister of Jharkhand
Aman Raj - Indian golfer
Kulwant Singh - former Indian army general
Vineet Verma - Indian film director
Rehana Fathima - Indian activist
Deepak Kapoor - 22nd chief of Indian army
Manoj Pande - Indian railway officer
A. G. Perarivalan - Indian assassin
Yakub Memon - chartered accountant and convicted criminal
Pushpa Preeya - Indian social activist
Sudipta Chakraborty - Indian actress
Aditya Bandopadhyay - LGBT rights activist
Swapna Patker - Indian film producer
Shiv Kumar Rai - Indian journalist

See also 
 List of universities in India
 Universities and colleges in India
 Education in India
 Education in Delhi
 Distance Education Council
 University Grants Commission (India)
 National Institute of Open Schooling (NIOS)

References

External links 
 

 
1985 establishments in Delhi
Central universities in India
Distance education institutions based in India
Educational institutions established in 1985
Monuments and memorials to Indira Gandhi
Open educational resources
Open universities in India